Traverse Peak is in the northern Teton Range, Grand Teton National Park, Wyoming. The mountain rises abruptly above Moran Canyon to the south and the south fork of Snowshoe Canyon to the north. From Moran Bay on Jackson Lake, the south slopes of the mountain can be seen behind Bivouac Peak rising above Moran Canyon.

References

Mountains of Grand Teton National Park
Mountains of Wyoming
Mountains of Teton County, Wyoming